In mathematics, the multivariate gamma function Γp is a generalization of the gamma function. It is useful in multivariate statistics, appearing in the probability density function of the Wishart and inverse Wishart distributions, and the matrix variate beta distribution.

It has two equivalent definitions. One is given as the following integral over the  positive-definite real matrices:

The other one, more useful to obtain a numerical result is:

In both definitions,  is a complex number whose real part satisfies . Note that  reduces to the ordinary gamma function. The second of the above definitions allows to directly obtain the recursive relationships for :

Thus

 
 

and so on.

Where G is the Barnes G-function, the indefinite product of the Gamma function.

The function is derived by Anderson from first principles who also cites earlier work by Wishart, Mahalanobis and others.

There also exists a version of the multivariate gamma function which instead of a single complex number takes a -dimensional vector of complex numbers as its argument. It generalizes the above defined multivariate gamma function insofar as the latter is obtained by a particular choice of multivariate argument of the former.

Derivatives 

We may define the multivariate digamma function as

and the general polygamma function as

Calculation steps 

 Since

it follows that 

 By definition of the digamma function, ψ, 

it follows that

References

 1. 
 2. A. K. Gupta and D. K. Nagar 1999. "Matrix variate distributions".  Chapman and Hall.

Gamma and related functions